Itihas Academy is an organization composed of history researchers in Bangladesh. The organization was unofficially originated at Jagannath University in the 2001. It was registered on the official list of the Government of Bangladesh in the 2005. Its headquarters are located in Dhaka.

Description
The purpose of the academy is to provide guidance for the study and research of  retraining students and researchers. The organization is managed by an executive committee. The executive committee consists of a president, a director, five vice presidents, a secretary, an assistant secretary, a treasurer and five members. Anyone with a bachelor's degree in history can apply for membership.

Activities
In addition to Bangladesh, the academy annually organizes international seminars on various topics to create  The academy organizes workshops on research methodology and contributes to the publication of research papers and books on the  Apart from organizing an international seminar on History and Heritage, Establishment the academy encourages researchers to study the oldest history traditions, archaeology, architecture, women's movement, feminism, arts, education, literature, philosophy, knowledge, science, religion and politics, history and culture.

Publications
Itihas Academy has published the following books:

The political-economic source of religious sectarianism
Biodiversity of the terracotta fruit of the Soompur Mahabharata
The Early History of South East Bengal
The Role of the United States in the Development of the South Korean Economy 1945-1990: A Historical Study (2017)
Structure of Education in Renfrewshire 1830-1872 (2017)
মাহমুদা খাতুন, মঙ্গলকাব্যে নারী (2019)
ইতিহাস একাডেমি ঢাকা: প্রতিষ্ঠান পরিচিতি ও প্রবন্ধ-নির্দেশিকা (2020)

Journal
The academy published its first journal, entitled History of the Academy: Contemporary Historical Columns in 2003. Regular periodicals have been published on the initiative of the organization under the heading of ইতিহাস প্রবন্ধমালা() [বার্ষিক] from the 2009, Journal of The Itihas Academy [Biennially]

https://www.itihasacademybd.com/==References==

2001 establishments in Bangladesh
History organisations based in Bangladesh
Research institutes in Bangladesh